Kharshbun and Sharkhbun are sons of Sarban, the first son of the legendary Pashtun ancestor Qais Abdur Rashid.  The Sarbani tribes, all supposed descendants of Sarban, form one of the major lineage branches of the Pashtun tribes.  Kharshbun's progeny compose the eastern Pashtuns, and he had three sons Kand, Zamand, Kasi, whereas his brother Sharkhbun's progeny compose the Western Pashtuns, the most famous of these latter Pashtuns being the Durrani or Abdali tribes.  The following is a genealogical breakdown of Kharshbun's sons and the tribes that are said to be their descendants, as found in Olaf Caroe's history, The Pathans.
 
Kharshbun:
Kand
Khakheykhel
Yusufzai
Mandanr 
Gigyani tribe
Tarkalani 
Ghoryakhel
Khalil
Daudzai
Mohmand
Chamkani
Shalmani
Mullagori
Zakhil or Zakhilwal
Hazarbuz
Zamand tribe
Kheshgi
Muhammadzai (Hashtnagar)
Kasi
Shinwari
Gumoriani

References

Pashtun tribes